Fureai is a Japanese term to refer to the formation of emotional connection between people of different age group and/or profession within the community.

Etymology
The word "Fureai" is composed of fure from  fureru (触れる to touch/make contact) and ai (合い  mutuality/both sides/together). It could be translated as "contact; connectedness; rapport".

Linguistic definition
"Fureai" approximates the English expressions for "mutual touch" or "mutual contact".

Generally, the word "Fureai"" is used in the following contexts:

 Only applied for socially-beneficial realms (such as welfare, education and environmental protection)
 Evaluates emotional relationship while excluding exchange of technical knowledge and/or arrangement of political/economic interests
 makes it necessary that humans (or between human(s) and animals) keep in face to face contact, excluding connections by Internet, mobile phones and other IT devices.

The following are examples of correct usage in Japan:

 Fureai between children and carers at a kindergarten
 Fureai between children and animals at a zoo
 Fureai with Nature
 Fureai between an enka singer and the elderly
 Fureai between nurses and patients

The following examples would not be correct Japanese usage:

 Fureai by way of Internet
 Fureai between Yakuzas and Politicians
 Fureai between executives of local businesses
 Fureai among IT experts

History of usage
"Fureai" is a relatively recent addition to Japanese, first usage recorded in the 1970s and 1980s.

The acceptance of Fureai reflects Japan's socioeconomic transformation, particularly the collapse of traditional communities.  Most Japanese had been living, since its economic growth in 1950s and 1960s, in their rural community with agriculture, fishing and/or forestry as its main industry, with their own extended family where the elderly lived together with their offspring, but the popularization of nuclear family and individualism made some people, especially the elderly, suffer from social exclusion.  The traditional childrearing method also disappeared as a result of such a social change, giving rise to delinquency in the adolescence and the concept "Fureai" became popular in Japan as a means to solve such social issues by trying to create their emotional relationship.

Difference from solidarity
"Fureai" is somewhat similar to "solidarity", which refers to the union of people in order to achieve a common social goal.  "Fureai," on the other hand, does not imply any goal, but merely to offer some emotional connection.

See also
 Gemeinschaft and Gesellschaft
 Fureai Kippu
Physical intimacy
Internet influences on communities

References

Japanese words and phrases